Arthur Cant (28 March 1864 – 16 July 1949) was a New Zealand cricketer. He played in two first-class matches for Canterbury from 1890 to 1901.

See also
 List of Canterbury representative cricketers

References

External links
 

1864 births
1949 deaths
New Zealand cricketers
Canterbury cricketers
Cricketers from Christchurch